Alina Khan (Urdu: علینہ خان) is a Pakistani actress known for her lead roles in the short film Darling in 2019 and the feature film Joyland in 2022. She is the first transgender person to have a lead role in a major Pakistani film.

Early life and career 
Khan was born into a Muslim family in Lahore, Pakistan. She has described facing societal discrimination due to being transgender, and how after being contacted by an NGO in Pakistan, she auditioned and won a lead role in the film Darling, which won the Orizzonti Award for Best Short Film at the Venice Film Festival and had global distribution rights sold to Focus Features. According to Aiman Rizvi, writing for Dawn about Darling, "The crux of the story is perhaps best encapsulated in the words of the lead actress, Alina Khan, a trans woman who describes her personal struggle in the industry, “I’ve always wanted to act in movies, since I was a child. But then I’d ask myself, how are they going to cast me? As a man, or a woman?”"

Khan has also appeared in the short film Happy Marriage, as well as commercials, a music video by Ali Sethi, and on the television show Good Morning Zindgi. In 2018, she performed as a dancer at the Naaz Theatre in Lahore.

Joyland 
Khan made her debut at the 75th Cannes Film Festival in the role of Biba in Joyland, the first Pakistani feature film screened at Cannes, and "the first major Pakistani motion picture to feature a trans actor in a lead role", according to The Guardian. Khan, the director, and other cast members were present during the Cannes screening where they received a standing ovation that lasted almost ten minutes. Siddhant Adlakha writes in a review for IndieWire that in the film, Khan "has an immediately commanding presence — when she walks into a room, she makes it hers" and "as Biba grows closer to Haider, inadvertently threatening what little footing he has left as a man in society’s eyes, a deep vulnerability begins to emerge, which Khan wields with precision." 

In November 2022, after the film was approved to be shown, the Pakistan Ministry of Information & Broadcasting banned Joyland from national distribution, in response to complaints about its subject matter, including from the Jamaat-e-Islami party. In response to the ban, Khan told The Guardian, "I've been very sad. There's nothing against Islam and I don't understand how Islam can get endangered by mere films." The ban was reversed on November 16, clearing the way for domestic screenings of the film.

Filmography

References

External links 

 Alina Khan on Instagram
 

Living people
1998 births
Transgender actresses
21st-century Pakistani actresses
Pakistani transgender people
Pakistani LGBT actors